Two Gentlemen of Verona is a rock musical, with a book by John Guare and Mel Shapiro, lyrics by Guare and music by Galt MacDermot, based on the Shakespeare comedy of the same name.

The original Broadway production, in 1971, won the Tony Awards for Best Musical and Best Book of a Musical. A London production followed in 1973. The Public Theater revived the piece in 2005.

Synopsis

Proteus and Valentine, lifelong friends, each leave their rural hometown of Verona to experience life in the city of Milan. Valentine strikes out on his own, arriving first; he falls in love with Sylvia, and makes plans to win her hand. However, her father, the Duke of Milan, has betrothed her to the wealthy but undesirable Thurio. Antonio, a Veronese nobleman, then decides to send his son Proteus to the Duke's court in Milan, to experience a more well-rounded life. After his arrival in Milan, Proteus also sets his sights on Sylvia, disregarding his loyalty to both Valentine and Julia (his sweetheart back home). Valentine admits his own plans to elope with Sylvia. Proteus tells the Duke of their plans, gaining favor for himself - and causing Valentine's banishment from the court. Meanwhile, in Verona, Julia asks her maid Lucetta for help, in deciding upon which of the two she should fall in love with. Julia disguises herself as a page) named Sebastian so she can travel to Milan—accompanied by Lucetta, in the male guise of Caesario—to be reunited with Proteus. After arriving at court, she witnesses Proteus and Thurio wooing Silvia.

While traveling to Mantua, the exiled Valentine is kidnapped by outlaws, who have been banished also. They demand that Valentine become their king, but if he refuses, they intend to kill him; Valentine accepts. In Milan, Julia (disguised as Sebastian) delivers to Silvia the ring Proteus gave her, on his behalf (not realizing the page was actually his Veronese girlfriend). Silvia enlists her friend Sir Eglamour to help her escape her betrothal to Thurio, and to find Valentine instead. However, while traveling through the forest, they are overtaken by a band of outlaws. Eglamour runs away, leaving Silvia to fend for herself.

By then, the Duke, Proteus, and Thurio, along with the disguised Julia, organize a search party for Silvia. Proteus wrests Silvia away from the outlaws. Proteus demands that Silvia give him some sign of her favor for freeing her, but she refuses. He tries to rape her, but the hidden Valentine emerges and stops him. Proteus apologizes, and Valentine offers to give him Silvia as a token of their friendship. Then "Sebastian" (Julia) faints, revealing her true identity. Proteus decides he really loves Julia more than Silvia, taking her instead. The Duke realizes that Thurio is a thug, and recognizes Valentine is much nobler and should marry Silvia. Valentine asks for clemency for the outlaws, and suggests that his marriage to Silvia and Proteus' marriage to Julia should take place on the same day.

Productions

Broadway 
After tryouts at the Delacorte Theater in Central Park in the summer of 1971 and twenty previews, the Broadway production, directed by Mel Shapiro and choreographed by Jean Erdman replaced by Dennis Nahat for Broadway and London productions, opened on December 1, 1971 at the St. James Theatre, where it ran for 614 performances.  The cast included Raul Julia, Clifton Davis, Jonelle Allen and Diana Davila in the leads; Stockard Channing and Jeff Goldblum (in his first Broadway performance) were in the chorus. In his review for The New York Times, Clive Barnes wrote, "What I really love about Two Gentlemen is its simplicity. Beneath all the multicolored gimmicks and extravagances, there are real people living and loving, and this I find very moving."

The musical won two Tony Awards including Best Musical over such shows as Grease and Follies.

The original Broadway cast album was released on ABC Records in the US at the time; through merger and acquisition over the years, the Universal Music Group now owns the rights. The master tapes were restored for digital release through the Decca Broadway label in 2002.

Australia 
An Australian production was presented at Her Majesty's Theatre in Melbourne, opening on March 31, 1973. The production featured John Waters, Gilbert Price, Gail Boggs and Judd Jones.

West End 
A West End production was mounted at the Phoenix Theatre beginning on April 26, 1973 and ran for 237 performances.  Mel Shapiro directed with Dennis Nahat staging and choreography.  The original London cast included B. J. Arnau (Silvia), Ray C. Davis (Proteus), Jean Gilbert (Julia), Derek Griffiths (Thurio), Benny Lee (Launce), Michael Staniforth (Speed), and Samuel E. Wright (Valentine).

Revivals 
The New Jersey Shakespeare Festival revived the piece in 1996, directed by Robert Duke and starring Philip Hernandez, Dana M. Reeve, and Keith Byron Kirk.

The musical was revived by the Public Theater in their Shakespeare in the Park series for a limited run, from August 28, 2005, to September 11, 2005, at the Delacorte Theater.  Kathleen Marshall directed and choreographed, and the cast featured Norm Lewis (Valentine), Oscar Isaac (Proteus), Rosario Dawson (Julia), Renée Elise Goldsberry (Silvia), Paolo Montalban (Eglamour), Mel Johnson Jr. (Duke of Milan) and John Cariani (Speed).

Critic Ben Brantley, in The New York Times, compared the "festive production" to "a fruity sangría", praising the cast but concluding that the work has not held up well.  He wrote that the play's "wayward" characters were "not without parallels among the lotus-eating youth of the post-Woodstock years – a comparison that Messrs. Shapiro, Guare and MacDermot made canny use of. They also scaled down Shakespeare's passages of poetic pain for an approach that emphasized an easygoing, multicultural exuberance over wistful poetry and nonsense over sensibility.... [But] MacDermot's songs... lack the variety of his score for Hair.... And the lyricism Mr. Guare is known for as a playwright is rarely in evidence in his clunky work here as a lyricist".

Songs

Act I
 Summer, Summer - Ensemble
 I Love My Father - Ensemble
 That's a Very Interesting Question - Proteus and Valentine
 I'd Like to Be a Rose - Proteus and Valentine
 Thou, Julia, Thou Hast Metamorphosed Me - Proteus
 Symphony - Proteus and Ensemble
 I Am Not Interested in Love - Julia
 Love, Is That You? - Vissi D'Amore
 Thou, Proteus, Thou Hast Metamorphosed Me - Julia
 What Does a Lover Pack? - Julia, Proteus and Ensemble
 Pearls - Launce
 I Love My Father (Reprise) - Proteus
 Two Gentlemen of Verona - Julia, Lucetta and Ensemble
 Follow the Rainbow - Valentine, Speed, Proteus, Launce, Julia and Lucetta
 Where's North? - Valentine, Speed, Duke of Milan, Silvia, Thurio and Ensemble 
 Bring All the Boys Back Home - Duke of Milan, Thurio and Ensemble
 Love's Revenge - Valentine
 To Whom It May Concern Me - Silvia and Valentine
 Night Letter - Silvia and Valentine
 Love's Revenge - Valentine, Proteus, Speed and Launce
 Calla Lily Lady - Proteus

Act II
 Land of Betrayal - Lucetta
 Thurio's Samba - Thurio, Duke of Milan and Ensemble
 Hot Lover - Launce and Speed
 What a Nice Idea - Julia
 Who Is Sylvia? - Proteus, Tavern Host and Ensemble
 Love Me - Silvia and Ensemble
 Eglamour - Eglamour and Ensemble
 Kidnapped - Julia, Duke of Milan, Proteus, Thurio and Ensemble
 Mansion † - Valentine
 Eglamour (Reprise) - Silvia and Eglamour
 What's a Nice Girl Like Her - Proteus
 Dragon Fight - Dragon, Eglamour, Proteus and Valentine
 Don't Have the Baby - Julia, Lucetta, Speed and Launce
 Love, Is That You? (Reprise) - Thurio and Lucetta
 Milkmaid - Launce and Milkmaid
 I Love My Father (Reprise) - Full Company
 Love Has Driven Me Sane - Full Company

† This number was replaced in the original London production by the song "Howl", due to concerns that the lyric to "Mansion" was too New York-centric, with references to rent control, sublets, and other uniquely urban concerns. For 1971 Broadway audiences, which were more New Yorkers than tourists (the reverse of Broadway audiences today), these references would have been both commonly understood and very funny in this faux-Shakespearean context. Theaters producing the show now have a choice between using "Howl" or "Mansion."

Awards and nominations

Original Broadway production

References

External links

Centre Stage (Baltimore, MD) production
The Guide to Musical Theatre Two Gentlemen of Verona

1971 musicals
Broadway musicals
Plays and musicals based on The Two Gentlemen of Verona
Rock musicals
Musicals by Galt MacDermot
Tony Award for Best Musical
Tony Award-winning musicals